Tucker Lepley (born January 17, 2002) is an American professional soccer player who plays for UCLA Bruins.

Career
Lepley played with USL Championship side Swope Park Rangers during their 2019 season from Sporting Kansas City's academy. He made his first professional appearance on July 20, 2019, as an 83rd-minute substitute during a 4-0 loss to Ottawa Fury.

In 2020, Lepley began playing college soccer at the University of California, Los Angeles.

References

External links 
 Sporting KC profile
 

2002 births
Living people
American soccer players
Association football midfielders
Soccer players from Charlotte, North Carolina
Sporting Kansas City II players
UCLA Bruins men's soccer players
USL Championship players